Daniel John Rowlands (known as John; 1925 – 13 September 2004) was an eminent Anglican priest in the 20th Century.

Rowlands was born in 1925  and  educated at Bromsgrove School and Pembroke College, Cambridge. He was ordained in 1952. He was a Curate at Mary, Woodford and then with the Mission to Seaman until 1975 when he left to become vicar at St Mary's church, Woodbridge, Suffolk.  In 1983 he became  Dean of Gibraltar, a post he held for 3 years. In 1985, he returned to his home in West Wales where he was Rural Dean of Glyn Aeron until his retirement in 1995. He died on 13 September 2004.

References

1925 births
People educated at Bromsgrove School
Alumni of Pembroke College, Cambridge
Deans of Gibraltar
2004 deaths